A list of the films produced in Mexico in 1977 (see 1977 in film):

External links

1977
Films
Lists of 1977 films by country or language